Joseph Thompson Hughes   (February 21, 1880 – March 13, 1951) was a Major League Baseball outfielder for the Chicago Orphans in 1902. He went to college at Geneva College.  According to Sporting Life correspondent A.R. Cratty, due to injuries to the Orphans, Hughes shared time in right field during a series against the Pittsburgh Pirates with Hillebrand, who also played his only Major League game the previous day.   Cratty suggested that Hughes may have been the brother-in-law of long time Major League infielder Bobby Lowe, who was playing for the Orphans that season.

References

External links 

1880 births
1951 deaths
Major League Baseball outfielders
Baseball players from Pennsylvania
Chicago Orphans players